WSKX (90.7 FM) is a radio station broadcasting a Reggae and Soca music format. Licensed to Christiansted, U.S. Virgin Islands, the station is currently owned by Better Communication Group.

External links

SKX
Radio stations established in 2009
Reggae, soca and calypso radio stations
2009 establishments in the United States Virgin Islands
Saint Croix, U.S. Virgin Islands